Daniela Zini (born 30 May 1959) is a former Italian alpine skier.

Career
During her career she has achieved 8 results among the top 3 (2 victories) in the World Cup.

World Cup victories

National titles
Zini has won six national championships at individual senior level.

Italian Alpine Ski Championships
Slalom: 1980, 1981, 1982 (3)
Giant slalom: 1982, 1984 (2)
Combined: 1982

References

External links
 
 

1959 births
Living people
Sportspeople from the Province of Sondrio
Italian female alpine skiers
Alpine skiers at the 1980 Winter Olympics
Alpine skiers at the 1984 Winter Olympics
Olympic alpine skiers of Italy
Universiade medalists in alpine skiing
Universiade gold medalists for Italy
Competitors at the 1983 Winter Universiade
Competitors at the 1985 Winter Universiade